Kamancello is a Canadian Kamanche/Cello duo, composed of Raphael Weinroth-Browne (cello) and Shahriyar Jamshidi (Kamanche). It is an instrumental World musical group.

History
The Kamancello named when the duo was invited to perform at Festival du Monde Arabe de Montréal in 2015, the Festival chose “Kamancello” for the title. Their name is the combination of two musical instruments Kamanche and Cello. Kamancello is an improvisational cultural boundaries, their performances are typically based in improvisation on Kurdish modal music and Western Classical music on Kamanche (four-stringed-spiked-fiddle) and Cello. The band recorded their first self-titled studio album and Kamancello II: Voyage at Toronto’s recording Studio Union Sound Company in 2016.

Performances

 Windsor Symphony Orchestra 2019.
Canadian Opera Company 2019.
Cello Biennale 2018.
Tirgan Festival 2017.
Festival du Monde Arabe de Montréal 2015.

Discography

 Kamancello (album), the self-titled debut improvisation album in 2017.  
Kamancello II: Voyage in 2019. 
 Of Shadows released digitally in 2020.

References

Musical groups established in 2014
Canadian world music groups
2014 establishments in Canada